Mugalivakkam is a neighbourhood of Chennai. It is situated 16 km south-west of Chennai on the Mount-Poonamallee Road. It is bounded by Porur on the North Meenambakkam and Manapakkam on the South and South East, Madhanandhapuram and Gerugambakkam on the South West and Ramapuram on the North East directions. The nearest railway station is at Guindy which is about 6 kilometres away. Porur junction is around 2 km away and Kathipara Junction is around 5 km away.

The word, Mugalivakkam, might have evolved during the brief Mughal rule of Poonamallee during the later half of the 17th century CE and the 18th century CE.

Recent developments
DLF IT City was built and opened next to Mugalivakkam in 2010. Multinational companies such as IBM, CTS, L&T and Infotech have been located in this IT City. L&T ECC, L&T Ship Building and L&T Audco are also vested in this area. Mugalivakkam is included in Chennai city limits from 2011. The availability of small parks, educational institutions, hospitals, banks and superstores identify itself as a decent residential area in this part of the city. Government bus connecting Broadway runs daily from Arasamaram bus stop.

Flood prone
Residents of the M and M Thiruvalluvar Nagar (Mugalivakkam and Manapakkam) Residents Welfare Association said surplus water from the Pour Lake should drain into the Manapakkam Channel through Moulivakkam, Mugalivakkam, Madha Nagar, Rajeswari Avenue and Mahalakshmi Nagar. The channel once 40 feet wide drains surplus water from the Porur Lake as well as storm water into the Adyar River at Manapakkam. The problem, residents complained, was primarily due to the shrinking of the Manapakkam Channel.

Residents of the Thiruvalluvar Nagar unable to reach homes as the  area is completely under water in the years 2005, 2006, 2008, 2011 and 2015. Adding to the inundation is the problem of breaches in Manapakkam canal that runs 500 metres from the locality. Two breaches each five feet wide allow water from the canal to flow into Thiruvalluvar Nagar.

Educational institutions

CBSE affiliated

Lalaji Memorial Omega International school
Pon Vidyashram
Padma Seshadri Bala Bhavan
Velammal Bodhi Campus

State Board Affiliated

St. Ann's Matriculation Higher Secondary School 
Government High School 
M.K.M. Matriculation Hr.Sec. School
Swamy's School
St. Christopher's Nursery & Primary School
David Primary School

Health care and Hospitals
 Amruth Orthopaedic Centre
 Thirdeye Optics (Eye Care) near Arasamaram Junction
 Kedar Hospital
 Meru Ortho Specialty Centre (Kedar Hospital).
 Government health care center
 Hriday Hospital
 St. Thomas Primary Health Center
 Nalam Hospital
 Tamara Dental Clinic
 Delta Hospitals

Temples
 Aagatheeswarar Temple
 Varadaraja swamy Temple
 Murugan Temple
 Sri Ayyappan Temple
 maariamman Temple
 ellaiamman Temple
 panichathaman Temple
 kesava perumaal Temple
 jalakandishwarar Temple
 Subramanya Samy Temple
 Eeeshwaran Temple
 Perumal Temple
 Sri Sarvasakthi Agathiya Vetri Vinayagar Temple
 Sri Prathyangira Temple

Location in context
Mugalivakkam locality shares its boundary with some major metropolitan areas of the city. In the North and Northwest, it is bounded by Porur. In its Northeast lies Ramapuram, while in the West it extends to Moulivakkam. Manapakkam lies to the East and Southeast of this tech city and to the South and Southwest, it limits to Kolapakkam respectively.

References 

Neighbourhoods in Chennai
Suburbs of Chennai